Sunday Shoot Out is an Australian association football television series, that aired on Sundays on Fox Sports. It was hosted by Tara Rushton , with rotating panellists including John Kosmina, Archie Thompson, Ned Zelić and Daniel McBreen The show predominantly featured the A-League and Socceroos matches, with an occasional focus on the major European leagues.

See also

List of Australian television series

References

Fox Sports (Australian TV network) original programming
Australian sports television series
2012 Australian television series debuts
A-League Men on television
English-language television shows